The following is a list of the IRMA's number-one singles of 2002.

See also
2002 in music
List of artists who reached number one in Ireland

2002 in Irish music
2002 record charts
2002